Coleophora quercicola is a moth of the family Coleophoridae. It is found in Japan (Honshu) and South Korea.

The larvae feed on the leaves of Quercus mongolica. It is covered with yellowish-brown felt at the basal tubular part.

References

quercicola
Moths of Asia
Moths described in 1990